Highway Robbery is a collaborative studio album from Detroit rapper Guilty Simpson and Philadelphia producer Small Professor, featuring guests Statik Selektah, DJ Revolution, A.G., Boldy James, Elucid, and Castle. It was released digitally under independent hip hop label Coalmine Records and imprint Beat Goliath on September 24, 2013.

Track listing
All songs produced by Small Professor.

 "Take Your Power (Intro)" (1:38)
 "Get That Pay (Scooby Mix)" (2:25)
 "I'm The City" (4:21) (featuring Boldy James and Statik Selektah)
 "Blap (Interlude)" (1:45) 
 "It's Nuthin" (3:08) (featuring A.G.)
 "On The Run" (2:39) (featuring DJ Revolution)
 "Go" (2:22) (featuring Elucid and Castle)
 "Come Get Me (Outro)" (2:03)
 "Get That Pay (OG Mix)" (2:39)
 "The Easiest Way (Remix)" (1:43)

Personnel
Credits for Highway Robbery adapted from Allmusic.
 Small Professor – arranger, primary artist, producer
 Guilty Simpson – primary artist, vocals
 Statik Selektah – featured artist
 A.G. – featured artist
 Elucid – featured artist
 Castle – featured artist
 DJ Revolution – featured artist

References 

2013 albums
Collaborative albums
Guilty Simpson albums